Hiroki Ito (伊藤洸輝, Itō Hiroki, born 26 October 1999) is a Japanese diver. He competed in the 2020 Summer Olympics.

References

1999 births
Living people
People from Zama, Kanagawa
Divers at the 2020 Summer Olympics
Japanese male divers
Olympic divers of Japan
Sportspeople from Kanagawa Prefecture
21st-century Japanese people